Has a daughter Alyssandra and a son Mateo

Carlos das Neves (born 21 August 1968 in Cape Town, Western Cape) is a South African former football player and coach who last managed Vasco da Gama.

References

1968 births
Living people
South African soccer managers
South African soccer players
Sportspeople from Cape Town
White South African people
Association football midfielders
Hellenic F.C. players
South African people of Portuguese descent